Turi Emma King (born 31 December 1969) is a Canadian-British professor of Public engagement and Genetics at the University of Leicester. She worked on the DNA verification during the exhumation and reburial of Richard III of England. She is also known for featuring with Stacey Dooley on the BBC Two genealogy series, DNA Family Secrets.

Early life and education
King was born in Nottingham, England, as the eldest of three children born to Alan King, an engineer, and Daphne King, a housewife. She moved to Canada at an early age and was brought up in Vancouver, British Columbia. She studied at the University of British Columbia and worked on archaeological sites in Canada, Greece, and England, before moving to the Jesus College, Cambridge to read Archaeology and Anthropology. There she was awarded a Bachelor of Arts degree. She won a scholarship to study for a Master of Science degree in Molecular Genetics at the University of Leicester, gaining a First with Distinction. 

In 2000, she started her doctoral research as a Wellcome Trust Prize Student at the University of Leicester, specialising in genetic genealogy and "in tracing migration patterns by using genetics." Professor Sir Alec Jeffreys, the inventor of DNA fingerprinting, was on her PhD supervisory panel.

Her thesis on the relationship between British surnames and Y-chromosomal haplotypes was published in 2007, and eventually formed the basis of the book Surnames, DNA and Family History, which she co-authored with David Hey and George Redmonds.

Career and research

King's research initially centered around genetics, genetic genealogy, forensics, and surnames, and using aspects of human DNA such as the Y chromosome to track past human migrations. Her work has included tracing "the signal of the Viking migration to the north of England", resulting in her appearance in Michael Wood's The Great British Story – A People's History on BBC Two, and in Michael Wood's Story of England. Her research themes involve combinations of molecular genetics with history, forensics, archaeology, geography, and genetic genealogy.

She led the genetic analysis and verification during the exhumation and reburial of Richard III of England. She was able to use the DNA from a direct living descendant of Richard III, who was traced by British historian John Ashdown-Hill.

In March 2021, she presented the BBC Radio 4 documentary "Genetics and the longer arm of the law".

Public speaking and consultancy 
As Professor of Public Engagement, King regularly undertakes public speaking at universities, schools and public events such as the Cheltenham Science Festival, the Moscow Science Festival, a Congressional Breakfast on Capitol Hill, the Galway Science and Technology Festival, and the Queen's Lecture in Berlin. She guest-presented the Royal Institution's Christmas Lectures in Japan in 2019 stepping in for Alice Roberts.

She advises on numerous television programmes and provides genetic expertise to authors such as Patricia Cornwell, Philippe Sands, Edward Glover, and David McKie.

King has also appeared in a number of television and radio documentaries as an expert in genetic genealogy, forensics, and/or ancient DNA.

Current resarch
The following is a list of projects King is either heading or has been involved with:

 The King's DNA: whole genome sequencing of Richard III
 What's in a Name? Applying Patrilineal Surnames to Forensics, Population History, and Genetic Epidemiology
 HALOGEN (History, Archaeology, Linguistics, Onomastics, and GENetics)
 The Irish Surnames Project
 The Mary Jane Kelly Project, dedicated to confirming the identity of Jack the Ripper's final confirmed victim.

TV, video and radio appearances
King has appeared in numerous television and radio documentaries, programmes and videos as well as advising on television and radio productions such as BBC's Who Do You Think You Are?
 Presented the BBC Radio 4 documentary: Genetics and the longer arm of the law
 Guest on The Life Scientific as DNA Detective Turi King
 Britain's Lost Battlefields with Rob Bell
 Richard III: The King in the Car Park
 Britain's Secret Treasures
 Richard III: Solving a 500 Year Old Cold Case (TEDx Leicester)
 Richard III – The DNA Analysis & Conclusion (University of Leicester)
 Richard III: The Resolution of A 500-Year-Old Cold Case (Irving K. Barber Learning Centre Lecture, UBC)

DNA Family Secrets 

DNA Family Secrets is a television series which began airing on BBC Two in March 2021,  presented by Stacey Dooley and King, it uses current DNA technology to solve family mysteries around ancestry, missing relatives and genetic disease. It was recommissioned for a second series in 2021.

Awards and honours
In 2016, King was appointed an honorary fellow of the British Science Association in recognition of her contribution to public engagement in science. She gave the J. B. S. Haldane prize lecture of The Genetics Society in 2018, at the Royal Institution, London. She is the current president of the Galton Institute as of the Summer of 2020 as announced in the Galton Review.

Personal life 
King is married.

See also
 Timeline of women in science

External links
 Turi King -official website

References

Selected Bibliography 

Living people
Canadian geneticists
Canadian archaeologists
Canadian women geneticists
Canadian women archaeologists
21st-century Canadian women scientists
21st-century British women scientists
University of British Columbia alumni
Alumni of Jesus College, Cambridge
21st-century Canadian women writers
Academics of the University of Leicester
1969 births